Focillidia texana, the southern focillidia moth, is a species of moth in the family Erebidae. It is found in North America.

The MONA or Hodges number for Focillidia texana is 8730.

References

Further reading

 
 
 

Poaphilini
Articles created by Qbugbot
Moths described in 1913